Las Casillas is a hamlet in Martos municipality, Province of Jaén, Spain. It is located between the rivers Salado and Víboras and located by the reservoir of Víboras. It is located in front of the Sierra de la Caracolera.

References

Populated places in the Province of Jaén (Spain)